Paul O'Sullivan (April 4, 1964 – May 18, 2012) was a Canadian comedy actor.

Originally associated with The Second City's Toronto troupe, he acted both on stage and in television shows such as George Shrinks, Friends and Heroes, Grossology and Getting Along Famously, as well as in guest roles on The Red Green Show, Murdoch Mysteries, Dan for Mayor and Little Mosque on the Prairie. He previously taught for Humber College's Comedy Writing and Performance program.

Personal life
His partner was actress Linda Kash, with whom he had three daughters; they lived on a farm outside Peterborough, Ontario.

Death
O'Sullivan died in a car accident near Peterborough on May 18, 2012, at approximately 2:30 p.m. local time. His car left the road, crossed the shoulder and struck a parked flatbed truck. He was 48 years old.

Filmography

Film

Television

Awards and nominations

References

External links

1964 births
2012 deaths
Canadian male stage actors
Canadian male voice actors
Canadian male television actors
Canadian people of Irish descent
Accidental deaths in Ontario
Road incident deaths in Canada
Academic staff of Humber College
Male actors from Ontario
20th-century Canadian male actors
21st-century Canadian male actors
Canadian sketch comedians
Canadian male comedians
20th-century Canadian comedians
21st-century Canadian comedians
Canadian Comedy Award winners